Zora Simčáková (born 27 March 1963) is a Slovak cross-country skier. She competed in the women's 15 kilometre classical event at the 1992 Winter Olympics.

Cross-country skiing results
All results are sourced from the International Ski Federation (FIS).

Olympic Games

World Championships

World Cup

Season standings

References

External links
 

1963 births
Living people
Slovak female cross-country skiers
Olympic cross-country skiers of Czechoslovakia
Cross-country skiers at the 1992 Winter Olympics
People from Liptovský Mikuláš District
Sportspeople from the Žilina Region